Greya variata is a moth of the family Prodoxidae. It is found in herb-rich meadows and along forest edges in the central Rocky Mountains at the border between the United States and Canada.

The wingspan is 11–13 mm. The forewings have a dark brown base and two pale tan-coloured patches. The hindwings are slightly lighter and have no pattern.

The larvae possibly feed on Osmorhiza occidentalis.

References

Moths described in 1921
Prodoxidae